Charles Baker or Charlie Baker may refer to:

Sports 
Charles Baker (American football) (born 1957), American football player
Charlie Baker (baseball) (1856–1937), American baseball player
Charles Baker (footballer) (1867–1924), English footballer
Charlie Baker (Australian footballer) (1880–1962), Australian rules footballer
Charlie Baker (English footballer) (born 1936), English footballer
Charlie Baker (racing driver) (born 1952), American NASCAR driver
Charles Baker (umpire) (died 1937), professional baseball umpire
Charles Baker (English cricketer) (1883–1976), English cricketer
Charles Baker (New Zealand cricketer) (born 1947), New Zealand cricketer
Charlie Baker (cricketer) (born 1939), Australian cricketer
Chuck Baker (born 1952), American baseball player
Doc Baker (Charles Baker, died early 1920s), American football player

Politicians 
Charles Baker (surveyor) (1743–1835), American surveyor and jurist
Charles D. Baker (attorney) (1846–1934), American attorney, New York state representative
Charles D. Baker (businessman) (born 1928), American businessman and U.S. government official, grandson of the above
Charlie Baker (born 1956), American health care executive and Governor of Massachusetts, son of the above
Charles H. Baker (1847–1919), Massachusetts state legislator
Charles Henri Baker (born 1955), Haitian politician
Charles J. Baker (1821–1894), American politician, banker and businessman from Maryland
Charles Minton Baker (1804–1872), American politician from New York and Wisconsin
Charles S. Baker (1839–1902), U.S. Representative from New York
Charles W. Baker (1876–1963), American farmer and politician from Illinois

Armed forces 
Charles Baker (Medal of Honor) (1809–1891), American Civil War sailor and Medal of Honor recipient
Charles George Baker (1830–1906), British recipient of the Victoria Cross and Lewa Pasha

Arts 
Charles Baker (actor), American actor
Charlie Baker (comedian) British comedian, actor, radio presenter
Charles Baker (artist) (1839–1888), American painter, saddler, gunsmith, importer, and silver-plate artisan
C. Graham Baker (1883–1950), American screenwriter and director
Chuck Baker (musician), Canadian musician

Other 
Charles Baker (instructor) (1803–1874), English instructor of the deaf
Charles Baker (Jesuit) (1616–1679), known as David Lewis, executed English Jesuit priest

Charles Fuller Baker (1872–1927), American entomologist
Charles H. Baker Jr. (1895–1987), American writer on food and drink
E. C. Stuart Baker (1864–1944), British ornithologist and police officer
Charles S. L. Baker (1859–1926), American inventor
Charles Baker (missionary) (1803–1875), British missionary to New Zealand

See also
Charles Arnold-Baker (1918–2009), English barrister and historian